Teal Lake is the name of one of several lakes:
Teal Lake (Michigan) in the city of Negaunee, Michigan
Teal Lake (Minnesota) in Jackson County, Minnesota
Teal Lake (New Zealand) on Enderby Island in the Auckland Islands